"You and Me" is a single by La Toya Jackson, taken from her sixth studio album, Bad Girl. The song was originally titled Verso L'Ignoto, sung in Italian by Marcella and Gianni Bella, who entered the song in the annual Sanremo Music Festival held from February 28 to March 3, 1990. Jackson wrote English lyrics to the song and also performed it in the festival.

The single was released only in a 7" format, with the song "He's My Brother", a biographical track about brother Michael Jackson, as the B-side. An alternate single mix exists, but remained unused for unknown reasons.

Dutch-Croatian singer Tatjana covered the song in 1991. The single peaked at No. 81 on the Dutch charts.

References

1990 songs
1990 singles
1991 singles
La Toya Jackson songs
Tatjana Šimić songs
Songs written by La Toya Jackson